Watford Football Club (also known simply as Watford, or as The Hornets) is an English football club from Watford, Hertfordshire. The team competed in the EFL Championship in 2011–12, their fifth consecutive season in the second tier of English football since their relegation from the Premier League in 2006–07. The 2011–12 season consisted of pre-season friendlies in July 2011, followed by competitive matches in the Football League, FA Cup and EFL Cup between August 2011 and April 2012. Assistant manager Sean Dyche became manager in July 2011, following the departure of Malky Mackay. The club's captain for the season was central midfielder John Eustace. Watford's chairman was Graham Taylor, who previously took Watford from the Fourth Division to the First Division as manager.

The team was widely tipped for relegation in 2011–12, following the pre-season departures of attacking players Danny Graham, Will Buckley and Don Cowie for a combined total of £4.5million. Following an early run of two wins from the first thirteen league fixtures, Watford's form improved, and the team lost just one of the remaining eleven games in 2011. Watford suffered four defeats in January 2012, and sold Marvin Sordell – then the team's top goalscorer – on the last day of the January transfer window. The team regained its form between February and April, and finished the league season in the top half of the table for the first time in four years. Watford's top scorer was Troy Deeney with 12 goals in all competitions, followed by Sordell with 10. Centre back Adrian Mariappa was voted Watford F.C. Player of the Season, while Sean Murray received the young player award.

Off the field, 2011 and 2012 marked a period of transition. Laurence Bassini purchased the club in March 2011, and after the 2010–11 season several senior members of staff left the club, including chief executive Julian Winter and manager Malky Mackay. Bassini himself attracted criticism from some Watford supporters, as well as chairman Graham Taylor, for his reluctance to speak to supporters or the media. Taylor resigned as chairman at the end of the season, and in June 2012 a company owned by Giampaolo Pozzo and his family took control of the club.

Background

The end of the 2010–11 season signalled the start of a period of change, on and off the pitch. Watford sold the club's top scorer Danny Graham to newly promoted Swansea City for £3.5 million. They also sold Young Player of the season Will Buckley to Brighton & Hove Albion for  £1m, and Liam Henderson left on a free transfer to York City. Off the field, Watford's chief executive Julian Winter left the club shortly after the sales of Buckley and Graham, and manager Malky Mackay joined Cardiff City the following week. On 21 June, 20-year-old defender Tom Aldred left on a season-long loan to Inverness Caledonian Thistle and Nathan Ellington went on a free transfer to Ipswich Town. Meanwhile, on the same day, Craig Forsyth came to Watford from Dundee United and Sean Dyche was appointed as new manager.

Pre-Season Friendlies

Championship

League table

Round by round summary

FA Cup

Football League Cup

Players

Statistics

No. = Squad number

Pos = Playing position

P = Number of games played

G = Number of goals scored

 = Yellow cards

GK = Goalkeeper

DF = Defender

MF = Midfielder

FW = Forward

 = Red cards

Yth = Whether player went through Watford's youth system

Joined club = Year that player became a Watford first team player

Age = Age of player on final day of season (28 April 2012)

Correct as of 28 April 2012.

Transfers
Unless a country is specified, all clubs play in the English football league system.

In

Out

Loans
  Loan end date was end of season
  Watford academy scholar

In

Out

Reserves and academy
Watford's reserve side played friendlies in 2011–12, following their withdrawal from the Totesport.com Combination East Division. The under-18s played their home games at Watford's training base at the UCL training ground, London Colney. They are members of the FA Premier Academy League. They went out of the FA Youth Cup in the fourth round away at Newcastle United, losing 2–1, having beaten Millwall 2–1 away in the third round. They also played in the Herts Senior Cup, going out to Bishop's Stortford in the first round. The side were coached by technical skills coach Adam Pilling from the end of August until the first week of October, when David Hughes, who had been appointed on 22 September, took up his position as youth team coach.

Watford's academy consists of 20 scholars:
 In the second year, goalkeeper Jack Bonham, defenders Chimdi Akubuine, Matt Bevans, Tommie Hoban, Brandon Horner and Aaron Tumwa, midfielders Stephan Hamilton Forbes, and Sean Murray, and strikers Dereece Gardner, Michael Kalu and Connor Smith.
 In the first year, defenders Kyle Connolly, David O'Connor and Jordan Wilmore, midfielders Austin Eaton, Kamaron English, Luke O'Nien, Jack Westlake, and strikers Bernard Mensah and Morgan Ferrier.

Murray signed a professional contract during the 2010 pre-season, alongside his scholarship forms. Bonham and Hoban signed a professional deals in September 2010 and May 2011 respectively. In July 2011 Mensah signed a contract that saw him turn professional on his 17th birthday. Ferrier joined Watford on 20 September after a trial period, having previously been in Arsenal's youth system. Connolly joined on 1 December at second year scholar age, following a trial period. In April Watford announced the fates of the remaining second-year scholars; Hamilton Forbes, Smith and Tumwa were given professional contracts, Akubine, Horner, Kalu and Gardner were released, while Bevans had his scholarship extended due an injury which kept him sidelined from October.

Hoban and Murray both made first-team appearances during 2010–11, while Smith was an unused substitute. Murray has played for the first-team in 2011–12, while Bonham has been an unused substitute. Bonham, Hamilton-Forbes, Hoban, Smith and Tumwa have all been loaned to non-league sides in 2011–12.

Notes

References

Watford F.C.
Watford F.C. seasons